The women's team foil was one of ten fencing events on the fencing at the 1996 Summer Olympics programme. It was the tenth appearance of the event. The competition was held on 25 July 1996. 33 fencers from 11 nations competed.

Brackets

Rosters

Argentina - 11th place
 Alejandra Carbone
 Yanina Iannuzzi
 Dolores Pampin

China - 7th place
 Liang Jun
 Wang Huifeng
 Xiao Aihua

France - 5th place
 Adeline Wuillème
 Clothilde Magnan
 Laurence Modaine-Cessac

Germany 
 Anja Fichtel-Mauritz
 Monika Weber-Koszto
 Sabine Bau

Hungary - 4th place
 Aida Mohamed
 Gabriella Lantos
 Zsuzsa Némethné Jánosi

Israel - 9th place
 Ayelet Ohayon
 Lilach Parisky
 Lydia Czuckermann-Hatuel

Italy 
 Francesca Bortolozzi-Borella
 Giovanna Trillini
 Valentina Vezzali

Poland - 8th place
 Anna Rybicka
 Barbara Wolnicka-Szewczyk
 Katarzyna Felusiak

Romania 
 Laura Cârlescu-Badea
 Reka Zsofia Lazăr-Szabo
 Roxana Scarlat

Russia - 6th place
 Olga Sharkova-Sidorova
 Olga Velichko
 Svetlana Boyko

United States - 10th place
 Ann Marsh
 Felicia Zimmermann
 Suzanne Paxton

References

Foil team
1996 in women's fencing
Fen